Sir Richard Rawdon Stawell KBE, (14 March 1864 – 18 April 1935) was an Australian doctor and  the President of the Victorian branch of the British Medical Association.

Early life
Stawell was born at Kew, Melbourne, Victoria, the sixth son of Sir William Stawell, Chief Justice of Victoria and his wife, Mary Francis Elizabeth née Greene. Stawell was sent to England to be educated at Marlborough school, but returned to Australia due to health issues and went to Hawthorn Grammar School under Professor Irving. He then went to Trinity College at the University of Melbourne and graduated M.B., B.S. in 1888, with the scholarship in medicine at the final examination, and M.D. in 1890. Stawell did post-graduate work from 1890 to 1892 in bacteriology, biochemistry and physiology at the National Hospital for Diseases of the Nervous System, Queen's Square, and the Great Ormond Street Hospital for Sick Children. After completing the Diploma of Public Health (London) in 1891, he did further research at Tübingen, Germany, and visited clinics in the United States of America before returning home.

Career
Stawell returned to Australia in 1893 and began to practise at Melbourne; earlier hopes of a private income faded with the bank crash. Stawell was appointed a member of the honorary medical staff of the Children's hospital 1893–1914 and became recognized as a specialist in children's diseases. From 1894 to 1900 he was honorary co-editor of the Australian Medical Journal, and from 1895 to 1906 was on the committee of the Medical Society of Victoria. He worked actively for the amalgamation of that society with the Victorian branch of the British Medical Association. From 1902 to 1924 Stawell was a member of the honorary medical staff of the Melbourne hospital. The clinical teaching before his appointment was not satisfactory, and it was largely due to Stawell's influence and example that an immense improvement took place. He was an ideal teacher of medicine, and it has been said of him that 

Stawell was elected a vice-president of the Victorian branch of the British Medical Association in 1908 and became president in 1910. He worked successfully for the amalgamation of the two Australian medical journals, the Australian Medical Gazette (NSW) and the Australian Medical Journal (Victoria), and in 1914 the two were absorbed in the new weekly journal, the Medical Journal of Australia. in World War I, Stawell served as Lieutenant-Colonel in charge of the medical section with the 3rd Australian General Hospital at the front in 1915 but was brought back to Australia in 1916 to continue his clinical teaching and other important home service work. Stawell became a physician to in-patients at the Royal Melbourne Hospital in 1919 and was also a member of the medical advisory committee to the Repatriation department of the Commonwealth. In the following year he was president of the medical section at the Australian medical congress at Brisbane. He resigned the position of physician to in-patients at the Royal Melbourne Hospital in 1921 and became a consulting physician to the hospital. He had joined the committee of the hospital in 1905 and in 1928 was elected president; he did important work for many years as chairman of the house committee.

Late life
In 1930 Stawell was first president of the Association of Physicians in Australasia and delivered the Halford oration at Canberra in November of that year. He was made vice-president at the centenary meeting of the British Medical Association in 1932. He was to have been president at the annual meeting of the British Medical Association at Melbourne in September 1935 but died at Melbourne on 18 April 1935. Stawell married Evelyn Myrrhee Connolly, daughter of H. J. Connolly, on 12 August 1908 who survived him with a son and two daughters. Stawell was created K.B.E. in June 1929. In 1933 his work for the profession was recognized by the founding of the Sir Richard Stawell Oration.

Stawell was tall and slightly built and an excellent tennis player in his youth and represented Victoria in intercolonial tennis. In later years he was a keen golfer and fly-fisher. He was president of the Melbourne Club in 1920. His quiet, slightly austere manner did not at first suggest his great personal charm, but among his intimates he could let his inner sense of fun have full play or talk with distinction on music or art. He was a good public speaker and an excellent committee-man. An authority on children's and nervous diseases, a great clinical instructor and possibly the ablest physician in the history of Australian medicine he was honoured and loved by the whole profession. The great immunologist Sir Macfarlane Burnet found him 'a man of much wisdom and immense charm', but with 'a waspish intolerance of stupidity'.

References

Additional References as given by the Dictionary of Australian Biography:
The Argus, Melbourne, 20 April 1935; 
British Medical Journal, 2 March, 27 April and 4 May 1935; 
The Medical Journal of Australia, 18 May 1935

Additional references as given by the Australian Dictionary of Biography:
Burnet, M., Changing Patterns, London, 1968. 
Casey, M., Charles S. Ryan, Melbourne, 1958
Rank, B. K., Jerry Moore and Some of His Contemporaries, Melbourne, 1975. 
Winton, R., Why the Pomegranate? Sydney, 1988

1864 births
1935 deaths
Medical doctors from Melbourne
Australian paediatricians
Knights Commander of the Order of the British Empire
People educated at Trinity College (University of Melbourne)
19th-century Australian medical doctors
20th-century Australian medical doctors
People from Kew, Victoria